Piz Prüna is a mountain of the Livigno Alps, located in Graubünden, Switzerland. Its  summit overlooks the Val Prüna.

References

External links
 Piz Prüna on Hikr

Mountains of Graubünden
Mountains of the Alps
Alpine three-thousanders
Mountains of Switzerland
Pontresina